The Sickness unto Death is a book written by Danish philosopher Søren Kierkegaard in 1849 under the pseudonym Anti-Climacus. A work of Christian existentialism, the book is about Kierkegaard's concept of despair, which he equates with the Christian concept of sin, which he terms "the sin of despair". Walter Lowrie wrote that he saw the themes in The Sickness unto Death as a repetition of those in Kierkegaard’s earlier work,  Fear and Trembling, and as being even more closely related to those in The Concept of Anxiety. Kierkegaard used two pseudonyms for opposite purposes: "Johannes Climacus" suggests that he is not a Christian, whereas "Anti-Climacus" suggests he is "an extraordinary Christian".

Summary
Anti-Climacus introduces the book with a reference to a phrase in the Gospel of John, 11:4: "This sickness is not unto death." The phrase occurs in John’s telling of the story of Lazarus, in which Jesus raises a man from the dead. However, Anti-Climacus raises the question: would not this statement still be true even if Jesus had not raised Lazarus from the dead? While the human conception of death is that it is the end of life, the Christian conception of death is that it is merely a stop along the path of eternal life, and thus nothing to be feared. Rather, it is the inability to die that is to be feared. The real "sickness unto death", according to Anti-Climacus, is not physical death but despair—a kind of spiritual death, which stems from not embracing one's self.

According to Kierkegaard, an individual is "in despair" if he does not align himself with God or with God's plan for the self. In this way, he loses his self.  Kierkegaard defines the self as the "relation's relating itself to itself in the relation," and defines the human experience as the tension between "the finite and the infinite", and between "the possible and the necessary". He writes that this tension is identifiable with the dialectical balancing act—the relationship—between these opposing features. Although humans are inherently reflective and self-conscious, to become a true "self" one must be conscious that the source and ground of this "self" is love, "the power that created it". When one either fails to understand the true nature of the self, or the true nature of the power that creates and sustains it, he says, one is in despair.

There are three kinds of despair presented in the book: one of them relates to being unconscious of having a self; another to not wanting to be oneself; and the third, to feeling that one is not oneself. He describes the first kind as "inauthentic despair," because it is born of ignorance. In this state, one is unaware that one has a self that is separate from its finite reality. One does not realize that there is a power that created and continues to create oneself, and accepts the idea of finitude because one is unaware of the possibility of being more inherent in selfhood. The second kind of despair is refusing to accept the self outside of immediacy; only defining the self in immediate, finite terms. This is the state in which one realizes that one has a self, but wishes to lose this painful awareness by arranging one's finite life so as to make the realization unnecessary. This stage is loosely comparable to Sartre's bad faith. The third kind is awareness of the self without a willingness to acknowledge the dependence of that self on love, i.e., the power that created one. In this state, one accepts the eternal, and may or may not acknowledge love, but refuses to accept the aspect of the self that is love. Kierkegaard describes  this kind of despair as the most heightened kind, and labels it "demonic".

To not be in despair is to have reconciled the finite with the infinite, to exist in awareness of one's own self and of love's power. Specifically, Kierkegaard defines the opposite of despair as faith, which he describes by the following: "In relating itself to itself, and in willing to be itself, the self rests transparently in the power that established it." People commonly ascribe the name "God" to the "power that created" the self, but Anti-Climacus's text is more subtle than this orthodox viewpoint. Kierkegaard certainly was thinking of God, but what it means to have a personal relation with God, and how God is love are the real subjects of this book. While the book is, in many ways, a phenomenology of prayer, it is just as much a phenomenology of what a Romantic-despite-himself could offer to the future of human maturity by way of a relational view of the self as grounded in creative love.

Relation to other works
The Sickness unto Death has strong existentialist themes. For example, the concepts of the finite and infinite parts of the human self translate to Heidegger's concept of "facticity" and Sartre's concept of "transcendence" in Being and Nothingness. Kierkegaard's thesis is, of course, in other ways profoundly different from Sartre, most obviously because of Kierkegaard's belief that only religious faith can save the soul from despair. This particular brand of existentialism is often called Christian existentialism.

Some have suggested that the opening of the book is an elaborate parody of the often bafflingly cryptic philosophy of Georg Wilhelm Friedrich Hegel; however, some scholars, such as Gregor Malantschuk, have suggested otherwise.

In popular culture
 The Polish minimalist composer Tomasz Sikorski wrote a piece of music inspired by the work, which includes a recitation of Kierkergaard's text.
 The sixteenth episode of the anime series Neon Genesis Evangelion, "The Sickness Unto Death, and Then...", is named after the book. Much of the series' philosophical and psychological subtext is influenced by, and makes reference to, the pessimism of Arthur Schopenhauer and the existentialism of Kierkegaard and Jean-Paul Sartre.
 The manga Sickness Unto Death ("Shi ni Itaru Yamai"), by Asada Hikari, uses Kierkegaard's ideas of despair within a story about multiple personality disorder.
 "Sickness unto Foolish Death" is the sixth song on the original soundtrack for the video game Silent Hill 3, composed by Japanese musician Akira Yamaoka. The elements of despair, sin and death are fundamental to the Silent Hill franchise.
 The band Typhoon has a song titled "The Sickness unto Death" from the album Hunger and Thirst. The book is also referenced in the song "Caesar", from White Lighter.

References

External links
 
 Die krankheit zum tode (The Sickness Unto Death) 1881 German translation 
 Commentary

1849 non-fiction books
Books by Søren Kierkegaard
Christian philosophy
Philosophy books
Works published under a pseudonym